Media was a fort in the Roman province of Dacia.

See also
List of castra

External links
Roman castra from Romania – Google Maps / Earth

Roman legionary fortresses in Romania
Ancient history of Transylvania
Mediaș